Luca Scinto (born 28 January 1968 in Fucecchio) is an Italian former cyclist.

Major results

1993
1st Gran Premio Industria e Commercio Artigianato Carnaghese
1995
1st Gran Premio Città di Camaiore
1st Tour de Berne
3rd Italian National Time Trial Championships
1997
1st  Tour de Langkawi
1st  Mountains classification
1st  Points classification
1 stage
1999
1st Giro di Toscana
2000
1 stage UNIQA Classic

Grand Tour Results

Tour de France
1997: 120th

Giro d'Italia
1994: 86th
1998: DNF
2001: 109th

References

1968 births
Living people
People from Fucecchio
Italian male cyclists
Sportspeople from the Metropolitan City of Florence
Cyclists from Tuscany